Monett is an unincorporated community in Sedan Township of Chautauqua County, Kansas, United States.

History
A post office was first opened in Mount Vernon (an extinct town), but it was moved to Monett in 1887 and remained in operation until it was discontinued in 1918.

References

Further reading

External links
 Chautauqua County maps: Current, Historic, KDOT

Unincorporated communities in Chautauqua County, Kansas
Unincorporated communities in Kansas